Pandalam KSRTC Bus Station is an important transport hub in the Indian city of Pandalam, owned and operated by the Kerala State Road Transport Corporation (KSRTC) under the depot code PDM. Long distance intrastate, inter-state and city buses run regularly from the bus station.

References

Bus stations in Kerala
Buildings and structures in Pathanamthitta district
Transport in Pathanamthitta district